Anderson Lake is a  body of water lying  west of Chimacum in Jefferson County, Washington. It is located in Section 9, Township 29N, Range 1W. The lake drains into Chimacum Creek and Port Townsend Bay. It is surrounded by Anderson Lake State Park. The lake's fish population includes lake-reared rainbow trout, that carry over to a second season from the initial spring fishery.

Toxic algae has caused the lake to be closed to all access on multiple occasions. The lake has annual cyanobacteria blooms dominated by dolichospermum (anabaena), aphanizomenon and microcystis. It is a major producer of anatoxin-a, a potent neurotoxin. County health officials have monitored local lakes for blue-green algae seasonally since 2007.

History
The lake was held in private hands until it was purchased by the Washington State Parks and Recreation Commission in 1969. The lake bears the family name of an earlier owner, Amanda Anderson.

References

External links
Anderson Lake Washington Department of Fish and Wildlife

Lakes of Washington (state)
Lakes of Jefferson County, Washington